Liam Waldock (born 25 September 2000) is an English professional footballer who plays for Gainsborough Trinity, as a midfielder.

Club career

Sheffield Wednesday
Liam signed his first professional contract on 25 September 2017, signing a deal until 2020. He signed a contract extension until the summer of 2021 on 28 February 2020. He would make his senior debut on 23 September 2020, starting an EFL Cup game against Fulham. A one-year option was activated in his contract on 12 May 2021, keeping him at the club until the summer of 2022. On 16 March 2022, manager Darren Moore announced he would be leaving the club upon the expiry of his contract.

Gainsborough Trinity
On 7 September 2021, he would join Gainsborough Trinity on a one-month loan deal making his debut the same day  against Morpeth Town. His loan spell would be extended on 5 October for a further month, before returning to his parent club on 1 November. On 13 June 2022, it was announced Waldock would return to Gainsborough Trinity following the expiration of his contract at Sheffield Wednesday, joining on a permanent deal.

Career statistics

References

2000 births
Living people
English footballers
Association football midfielders
Sheffield Wednesday F.C. players
Gainsborough Trinity F.C. players
English Football League players
Northern Premier League players